The 1944 Football League War Cup South Final was the final of the southern section of Football League War Cup, an unofficial cup competition held in England during the Second World War as a replacement for the suspended FA Cup. The match took place at Wembley Stadium on 15 April 1944 and was won by Charlton Athletic, who beat Chelsea 3–1. Charlton later contested a play-off against the winners of the equivalent North final, Aston Villa.

Match summary
Chelsea took an early lead thanks to a penalty from Joe Payne. Charlton equalised through Charlie Revell and took the lead on 36 minutes when a defensive mix-up enabled Don Welsh to score. Revell scored Charlton's third a minute later to put the game beyond Chelsea's reach. Dwight D. Eisenhower, Supreme Commander of the Allied forces, presented the cup to victorious captain Welsh. The match produced a record gate of £26,000, of which £12,000 was recouped by the Government in Entertainment Tax.

Match details

Notes

References

War Cup South Final 1944
War Cup South Final 1944
1943–44 in English football
Football League War Cup
1944 in English sport